Neroli Susan Fairhall  (26 August 1944 – 11 June 2006) was a New Zealand athlete, who was the first paraplegic competitor in the Olympic Games.

Biography
Born in Christchurch in 1944, Fairhall took up archery following a motorbike accident that paralysed her from the waist down, ending her previous athletic career. She was able to compete in the 1984 Los Angeles Olympic Games, shooting for New Zealand and finishing in 35th place. Fairhall was the first paraplegic to compete in the Olympic Games.

Fairhall won gold when archery was first introduced to the Commonwealth Games in Brisbane in 1982.

A national champion for many years, Fairhall won medals and held titles at the Paralympics, IPC-Archery World Championships and many international tournaments. She participated in four Summer Paralympics, in 1972, 1980, 1988, and 2000. At her first Paralympic Games she competed in track and field athletics. At the 1980 Games, she took part in both athletics and archery, winning a gold medal in the latter sport. At the 1988 and 2000 Paralympics she competed in archery only.

In the 1983 New Year Honours, Fairhall was appointed a Member of the Order of the British Empire, for services to archery and the disabled. She continued to coach at her Christchurch archery club after retiring from shooting. She died on 11 June 2006, aged 61, due to illness arising from her disability.

See also
 List of athletes who have competed in the Paralympics and Olympics

References

Sources

External links
  (archive)
 
 
 
 

1944 births
2006 deaths
New Zealand female archers
Olympic archers of New Zealand
Archers at the 1984 Summer Olympics
Archers at the 1982 Commonwealth Games
Commonwealth Games gold medallists for New Zealand
Paralympic archers of New Zealand
Archers at the 1980 Summer Paralympics
Archers at the 1988 Summer Paralympics
Archers at the 2000 Summer Paralympics
Athletes (track and field) at the 1972 Summer Paralympics
Athletes (track and field) at the 1980 Summer Paralympics
Paralympic gold medalists for New Zealand
Wheelchair category Paralympic competitors
Medalists at the 1980 Summer Paralympics
New Zealand Members of the Order of the British Empire
Commonwealth Games medallists in archery
Paralympic medalists in archery
People with paraplegia
Wheelchair discus throwers
Wheelchair shot putters
New Zealand wheelchair racers
Paralympic discus throwers
Paralympic shot putters
Medallists at the 1982 Commonwealth Games